Acanthodactylus haasi, also known commonly as Haas' fringe-fingered lizard or  Haas's fringe-toed lizard, is a species of lizard in the family Lacertidae. The species is endemic to the Arabian Peninsula.

Etymology
The specific name, haasi, is in honor of Austrian-born Israeli herpetologist Georg Haas.

Geographic range
A. haasi is found in Oman, Saudi Arabia, and United Arab Emirates.

Habitat
The preferred habitats of A. haasi are desert and shrubland.

Reproduction
A. haasi is oviparous.

References

Further reading
Leviton, Alan E.; Anderson, Steven C. (1967). "Survey of the reptiles of the Sheikhdom of Abu Dhabi, Arabian Peninsula. Part II. Systematic account of the collection of reptiles made in the Sheikhdom of Abu Dhabi by John Gasperetti". Proceedings of the California Academy of Sciences, Fourth Series 35: 157–192. (Acanthodactylus haasi, new species, pp. 177-178 + Figures 9B, 10B on pp. 174–175).
Leviton, Alan E.; Anderson, Steven C.; Adler, Kraig; Minton, Sherman A. (1992). Handbook to Middle East Amphibians and Reptiles. (Contributions to Herpetology No. 8). Oxford, Ohio: Society for the Study of Amphibians and Reptiles (SSAR). 252 pp. .
Salvador, Alfredo (1982). "A revision of the lizards of the genus Acanthodactylus (Sauria: Lacertidae)". Bonner Zoologischen Monographien (16): 1–167. (Acanthodactylus haasi, pp. 139–143, Figures 92–94, Map 29). (in English, with an abstract in German).
Sindaco, Roberto; Jeremčenko, Valery K. (2008). The Reptiles of the Western Palearctic: 1. Annotated Checklist and Distributional Atlas of the Turtles, Crocodiles, Amphisbaenians and Lizards of Europe, North Africa, Middle East and Central Asia. (Monographs of the Societas Herpetologica Italica). Latina, Italy: Edizioni Belvedere. 580 pp. .

Acanthodactylus
Reptiles described in 1967
Taxa named by Alan E. Leviton
Taxa named by Steven C. Anderson